Limansky (masculine), Limanskaya (feminine), or Limanskoye (neuter) may refer to:
Limansky District, a district of Astrakhan Oblast, Russia
Limansky (rural locality), name of several rural localities in Russia
Lymanske (disambiguation) (Limanskoye), name of several places in Ukraine